FMN may refer to:

 Federated Mission Networking
 Facial motor nucleus
 Flavin mononucleotide
 Flour Mills of Nigeria, a Nigerian agribusiness company
 FMN (TV channel), Indonesia
 Formins
 The FAA LID/IATA code for Four Corners Regional Airport in Farmington, New Mexico, United States
 Ministry of Defence (Denmark)
 Narrowband FM, or frequency modulation narrow